Dawn Fields is a Los Angeles based film producer, director and writer who has worked in the film and television industry since the 1990s. In 2015/2016, her short film Fragile Storm, starring Lance Henriksen (Aliens, Millennium), Mackenzie Mason, and Jody Jaress, garnered numerous film festival awards.  She is currently in development as the writer/director/producer of the Christmas horror/fantasy Zombie Elves and is also the writer/director/producer of the multi-award winning short film FOUND and the romantic dramedy Touch.  Before making the transition to writer/director, Fields worked as a producer, editor, assistant director, production manager and production assistant for such companies as Lucasfilm, Tristar, Twentieth Century Fox, Bret Ratner's Rat Productions, Orion, Lorimar, Morgan Creek, ABC, NBC/Universal and Aaron Spelling Productions. In the beginning of her career she worked on such notable projects as The Young Indiana Jones Chronicles (with George Lucas), Love Potion No. 9 (Sandra Bullock and Tate Donovan), Wilder Napalm (Dennis Quaid and Debra Winger), Free-Jack (Mick Jagger and Emelio Esteves) and Big Dreams and Broken Hearts: The Dottie West Story (Michelle Lee).

Background
Fields is originally from Atlanta, Georgia. She runs a production company in Los Angeles called Palm Street Films. In addition to film work she produced an award-winning music video for Gospel R&B artist Vickie Winans.

Career

1990s
In 1991, she was a production assistant in the Geoff Murphy directed film Freejack. The following year she worked in the same capacity in the made-for-television film Grass Roots which was directed by Jerry London. In 1993, she was the assistant director for Mardi Gras for the Devil which was directed by David A Prior, and starred Robert Davi, Michael Ironside and Lesley-Anne Down. Also that year she was production assistant in Wilder Napalm which was directed by Glen Gordon Caron, and starred Debra Winger and Dennis Quaid.

2000s
In 2009, Fields began filming a documentary about an abandoned water park called Rock-A-Hoola.

Her short film Touch that was co-produced with James Popiden starred Dove Meir and Natalie Shaw. It was shown at the 2014 Dances With Films festival in Los Angeles.Indegogo Touch - The Movie In 2014 she directed Fragile Storm''. She had co-written the story with Carly Street. It was co-produced by Debbie Rankin, James Popiden, and Kelly Raymer.  It starred Lance Henriksen, Mackenzie Mason, and Jody Jaress.

Filmography (selective)

References

External links
Palm Street Films

American film producers
American women writers
Living people
Year of birth missing (living people)
American women film producers
21st-century American women